Hagnesta Hill is an album by the Swedish band Kent, released in 1999 (Swedish version) and 2000 (English version).  For the English version two new songs, "Quiet Heart" and "Just Like Money" were recorded, and "Ett tidsfördriv att dö för" and "Insekter" were left out. "Ett tidsfördriv att dö för" was later used as a hidden track in the Digipak version, where it's called "A Timekill to Die For". This was the second and last English album Kent recorded.

Track listing

Swedish version

English version

* The lyrics contained in Rollercoaster (All those memories will be lost in time/Like tears in the rain) are lifted from the penultimate scene of Blade Runner, as spoken by Roy Batty to Rick Deckard. On Kent's previous album Isola, the band also paid homage to the film, as the song "OWC" stands for Off World Colonies and the opening piano line was also from the movie.

Personnel
Joakim Berg – lyrics, music
Martin Sköld – music
Zmago Smon (Zed) – producer, mixing
George Marino - mastering

Charts

Swedish

English

References 

Kent (band) albums
1999 albums